The Great Russian Regions are eight geomorphological areas in the Russian Federation displaying characteristic forms of relief. Seven of them are east of the Urals.

Geography 

 Central Siberian Plateau, a large elevated zone between the Yenisei and Lena rivers composed of various plateaus (Putorana Plateau, Anabar Plateau, Vilyuy Plateau, and Lena Plateau among others) deeply dissected by river valleys. Area .
 Central Yakutian Lowland, the alluvial plain of the middle Lena River separating the Central Siberian Plateau to the west and the East Siberian Mountains to the east. Area .
 East European Plain, a very large area that comprises the plains and depressions west and southwest of the Urals crossed by numerous large rivers, such as the Volga, Dnieper, Don and Pechora.
 East Siberian Lowland, a vast alluvial plain, swampy and dotted with thousands of lakes. The region includes the Yana-Indigirka, Kolyma and Aby lowlands, as well as the New Siberian Islands.
 East Siberian Mountains, a large mountainous area located in northeastern Siberia. It includes two large mountain systems, the Verkhoyansk Range and the Chersky Range, as well as other minor ones. To the east it reaches Cape Dezhnyov in the Bering Strait.
 North Siberian Lowland, a plain with a relatively flat relief separating the Byrranga Mountains of the Taymyr Peninsula in the north from the Central Siberian Plateau in the south.
 South Siberian Mountains, stretching roughly from east to west in the Siberian and Far Eastern Federal Districts of Russia, as well as partly in Mongolia.
 West Siberian Plain, large alluvial plain between the Urals to the west and the Yenisei River to the east, beyond which rises the Central Siberian Plateau. The lowland is bound by the coast of the Kara Sea to the north and by the foothills of the Altai Mountains to the southeast. The southern end extends into Kazakhstan. Area .

Landscapes

See also
Federal districts of Russia
Outline of Russia
Siberia§Geography

References

Geography of Russia
Geomorphology